
Year 41 BC was either a common year starting on Wednesday or Thursday or a leap year starting on Tuesday, Wednesday or Thursday (link will display the full calendar) of the Julian calendar (the sources differ, see leap year error for further information) and a leap year starting on Wednesday of the Proleptic Julian calendar. At the time, it was known as the Year of the Consulship of Antonius and Vatia (or, less frequently, year 713 Ab urbe condita). The denomination 41 BC for this year has been used since the early medieval period, when the Anno Domini calendar era became the prevalent method in Europe for naming years.

Events 
 By place 

 Roman Republic 
 Consuls: Lucius Antonius and Publius Servilius Vatia Isauricus.
 Perusine War: An armed resistance breaks out across Italy; the Umbrian city of Sentinum is captured and destroyed by Quintus Salvidienus Rufus.
 Lucius Antonius occupies Perusia. He accepts the appeal of the local population. Lucius and Fulvia are defeated by Gaius Julius Caesar Octavian in the Battle of Perugia.

 Egypt 
 Mark Antony meets Cleopatra VII in Tarsus (Cilicia) and forms an alliance. He returns to Alexandria with her and they become lovers in the winter of 41–40 BC. To safeguard herself and Caesarion, she has Antony order the execution of her (half) sister Arsinoe IV, who is living at the temple of Artemis in Ephesus.

Births 
 Gaius Asinius Gallus Saloninus, Roman consul under Caesar Augustus (d. AD 33)

Deaths 
 Arsinoe IV, Egyptian princess and (half) sister of Cleopatra VII (b. 68 or 67 BC)
 Pasherienptah III, Egyptian High Priest of Ptah (b. 90 BC)
 Serapion, Egyptian general (strategos) and governor

References